I Love You Da is a 2002 Indian Tamil-language action romance film directed by C. Raajadurai, starring Raju Sundaram and Simran, with Raghuvaran and Prakash Raj in supporting roles. The film, which had music composed by Bharadwaj, released in November 2002 to poor reviews.

Plot 
Raju is a small time cricketer who makes it big. Priya is his neighbour in love with him. But Raju pretends that he does not care for her, as he knows that his brother Madhan has a crush on her. This creates some confusion but finally the lovers get united.

In between Raju is selected in the Indian team and makes it to the World Cup. The finals are played between India and Pakistan. Priya's father is a bookie who tries to induce Raju into match fixing. But he does not fall into his trap and scores the required 20 runs to win the World Cup.

Cast 
Raju Sundaram as Raju
Simran as Priya
Raghuvaran as Rajkishore
Prakash Raj as Siddharth
Senthil as Raju's Grandfather
Janagaraj as Sadasivam
Vennira Aadai Moorthy as Pattabi
Alex as Inspector Pandiyan
Ramesh Khanna as Madhan
Indhu as Sudha
Singamuthu as Police constable

Production 
The film marked the debut of choreographer Raju Sundaram as the protagonist in films, after he had appeared in item numbers as well as a supporting role in Shankar's Jeans. The director of the film was to be Raajadurai, who had been an erstwhile assistant of director Manoj Kumar during the making of Vaanavil. When the film began production in late 2001, a Telugu version titled I Love You Raa was also planned. Actress Simran, Raju Sundaram's girlfriend during the period, was signed to play the female lead role. The couple however split during the production of the film. Early reports suggested that noted South Indian cricketers including Sadagoppan Ramesh, Anil Kumble, Rahul Dravid and Javagal Srinath may feature as themselves in the film, but this proved to be untrue.

Despite the completion of the film's scenes by early 2002, production delays meant that the film faced a belated release at the end of the year.

Release 
The film gained unanimously poor reviews upon release, with Malathi Rangarajan of The Hindu stating that the film "falls flat due to identifiable reasons — the director has not done his homework properly, the dialogue makes you squirm at times, none of the actors seems involved in the role taken up and to top it all the lead pair fails to make even a slight impression". Sify wrote "I Love You Da is like going to a barber for a trim, and ending up with a bald pate. The director attempts to articulate the craze for the game of cricket in India by focussing on a cricket star, but ends up by bowling a beamer to the audience!".

Soundtrack 

The soundtrack of the film was composed by Bharadwaj. Lyrics were written by Vairamuthu, Snehan and P. Vijay.

References 

2002 films
Films about cricket in India
2000s Tamil-language films
Films scored by Bharadwaj (composer)
2002 directorial debut films